Iman Razaghirad (born August 9, 1978) is an Iranian footballer who plays as a forward.

Club career
In 2009, Razaghirad joined Paykan after playing the previous season at Saipa.

Club career statistics

 Assist Goals

References

1978 births
Living people
Iranian footballers
Steel Azin F.C. players
F.C. Aboomoslem players
Saipa F.C. players
Pas players
Paykan F.C. players
Rah Ahan players
Persian Gulf Pro League players
Azadegan League players
Association football forwards